Mount Kenya University (MKU) is a private, multi-campus, university in the municipal county of Thika, Kenya. The university was founded by Prof. Simon N. Gicharu and has since become one of the largest private universities in Kenya, with an estimated 52,000 students, as of September 2015. MKU is chartered and ISO 9001:2015 Certified

Location
The coordinates of the university's main campus are 1°02'44.0"S, 37°04'54.0"E (-1.045559 37.081669).

The university maintains campuses at the following locations, as of April, 2020.

 Thika (Main) Campus - General Kago Road, Thika
 Mombasa Campus - MKU Plaza, Nkurumah Road, Mombasa 	
 Nairobi Campus - MKU Towers and Union Towers, Nairobi
 Parklands Law Campus
 Open Distance and Electronic Learning  (ODEL) Center - main campus 
 Nakuru Campus - Great Rift Plaza, opposite Valley Hospital, Nakuru
 Eldoret Campus - Eldoret
 Meru Campus - Meru  [opposite Meru County Assembly]
 MKU Rwanda Campus - Kagarama, Kicukiro, Kigali

History
The institution known as Thika Institute of Technology was established in the year 1996 by Dr. Simon Gicharu. Initially, the institute provided programs focused on management and computer training. Subsequently, in the same year, the Ministry of Education, Science and Technology Kenya conferred full registration approval to the institute as a fully-fledged institution of higher learning.

In the year 2005, the institute achieved another notable milestone by becoming the first privately-owned institution in Kenya to receive authorization from the Pharmacy and Poisons Board of the Kenya Ministry of Health to provide training to pharmaceutical technologists.

In 2006 the Commission for Higher Education (CHE)  which later changed to 'Commission for University Education Kenya (CUE)and approved the institute's request for collaboration with JKUAT to offer both diploma and degree programmes. After fulfilling all the requirements, the Commission for Higher Education issued MKU with the authority to establish a full-fledged privately funded university. In 2011, the university was awarded a charter by the government of Kenya, upon the recommendation of the Commission of Higher Education.

Academics
The university is organized into three colleges, 12 schools, and three institutes:

Institutes

 Institute of Security Studies, Justice and Ethics
 Institute of Film, Creative and Performing Arts
 Equip Africa Institute

Colleges

 College of Graduate Studies and Research 
 College of Health Sciences
 Equip College of Medical and Health Sciences

Schools

College of Health Sciences
Medical School
School of Pharmacy
School of Clinical Medicine
School of Nursing
School of Public Health
School of Business and Economics
 School of Education
 School of Engineering, Energy and the Built Environment
 School of Pure and Applied Sciences
 School of Social Sciences
 School of Law
 School of Computing and Informatics

References

External links
Mount Kenya University Official Website

 
Universities in Kenya
1996 establishments in Kenya
Private universities and colleges in Kenya
Educational institutions established in 1996